Summer Lake is the name of several geographic features, including:
Summer Lake (New Mexico), a lake in the U.S. state of New Mexico
Summer Lake (Oregon), a lake in the U.S. state of Oregon
Summer Lake, Oregon, a small community near the lake
Summer Lake Wildlife Area, a  wildlife area surrounding the lake

Summer Lake can also refer to:
Lacus Aestatis, an area on Earth's moon